Mireille Perrier (born 14 November 1959) is a French actress and stage director.

Career
She debut in theater with the Compagnie du Hasard in 1977, where she remained a member for two years.

Her first starring role was in  Leos Carax's Boy Meets Girl in 1984. Since then, Perrier has had major roles in other films such as Un monde sans pitié, Netchaïev est de retour, Toto le Héros, À vendre, Le Comptoir, Un dérangement considérable and L'entraînement du champion avant la course.

In 1991, Perrier received a Joseph Plateau Award in the "Best Belgian Actress" category for her work in the Belgian film Toto le Héros.

Theater

Filmography

External links

1959 births
Living people
French film actresses
People from Blois
20th-century French actresses
21st-century French actresses